Euthyroididae is a family of bryozoans belonging to the order Cheilostomatida.

Genera:
 Euthyroides Harmer, 1902

References

Cheilostomatida